Amanda Pilke (born 2 March 1990, in Joensuu) is a Finnish film actress.

Her first role was in the 2003 film Helmiä ja sikoja alongside Mikko Leppilampi and Laura Birn. She is also starring in a feature film called Kielletty Hedelmä ("Forbidden Fruit") directed by Dome Karukoski. The movie premiered in February 2009.

She has also been acting in TV series, TV films and short films: 2009 Virta - TV-serie, Actress Janina, dir Rike Jokela, 2008 Saviour of the world - TV-serie, Actress Jessi, dir Dome Karukoski, 2008 Ei kenenkään maa - short film, Actress a blond girl, dir Oskari Sipola, 2007 Älä unta nää - TV-serie, Actress Heli, dir Aleksi Mäkelä and 2006–2009 in Karjalan kunnailla - TV-serie as Actress Jonna, dir Markku Pölönen

In 2012, Pilke played the role of Milla in Naked Harbour and the role of Zara in Purge.

Filmography
 2012 Vuosaari (2012 film)
 2012 Purge
 2009 Kielletty hedelmä (Maria)
 2007–2008 Karjalan kunnailla (TV series; Jonna Sahioja)
 2003 Helmiä ja sikoja (Saara)

References

External links
 

1990 births
Living people
People from Joensuu
Finnish television actresses
Finnish film actresses
Finnish child actresses